Senior Open may refer to:

The Senior Open Championship, also known simply as the Senior Open
Senior major golf championships
AT&T Canada Senior Open Championship
Azores Senior Open
Dutch Senior Open
English Seniors Open
French Senior Open
Irish Senior Open
Italian Seniors Open
Japan Senior Open Golf Championship
United States Senior Open 
SBC Senior Open
Scandinavian Senior Open
Scottish Seniors Open
Spanish Senior Open
Swiss Seniors Open
Wales Seniors Open